Ho Chin-sung (born 5 November 1942) is a Taiwanese politician.

Career
He left the Democratic Progressive Party to join the Non-Partisan Solidarity Union in 2004, and ran for reelection as an NPSU candidate. Ho was indicted on charges of bribery in November 2004, after a three-year investigation had concluded.

References

1942 births
Living people
Democratic Progressive Party Members of the Legislative Yuan
Non-Partisan Solidarity Union Members of the Legislative Yuan
Members of the 5th Legislative Yuan
Chiayi County Members of the Legislative Yuan